Enoch Mankayi Sontonga ( – 18 April 1905) was a South African composer, who is best known for writing the Xhosa hymn "Nkosi Sikelel' iAfrika", which, in abbreviated version, has been sung as the first half of the national anthem of South Africa since 1994. Previously, it had been the official anthem of the African National Congress since 1925. It was also adopted by South Africa's newly formed northern neighbour, Zimbabwe and translated into Shona, "Ishe Komborera Afrika" from 1980 until 1994.

Early life and education

Sontonga, a Xhosa, was born in the city of Uitenhage in the Eastern Cape Colony. He trained as a teacher at the Lovedale Institution and subsequently worked as a teacher and choirmaster at the Methodist Mission school in Nancefield, near Johannesburg for eight years.

Career
The first verse and chorus of "Nkosi Sikelel' iAfrika" was composed in 1897 and it was originally intended to be a school anthem. Some sources say he wrote the tune the same year, but others contend that the tune was written by Joseph Parry as "Aberystwyth" and that Sontonga merely wrote new words. It was first sung in public in 1899 at the ordination of Reverend Mboweni, who was the first Tsonga Methodist minister. Later the Xhosa poet Samuel Mqhayi wrote a further seven verses.

Sontonga died in April 1905.

Personal life
Sontonga married Diana Mgqibisa, the daughter of a minister in the African Methodist Episcopal Church, and they had a son. Mgqibisa died in 1939.

Legacy
The song started to be more well known after John Langalibalele Dube's Ohlange Institute's choir used it. They played it at the South African Native National Congress meeting in 1912. It was sung after the closing prayer and the ANC adopted it as its official closing anthem in 1925. It was recorded in London as "Nkosi sikelel’ iAfrika" in 1923 and it was published by the Lovedale Press in 1927.

For many years, the site of Sontonga's grave was unknown, but it was finally located in the "Native Christian" section of the Braamfontein cemetery in the early-1990s. One of the reasons why the location of his grave remained a mystery is that it was listed under the name "Enoch" and not by his surname "Sontonga".

On 24 September 1996, Sontonga's grave was declared a national monument and a memorial on the site was unveiled by then-President Nelson Mandela. At the same ceremony, the South African Order of Meritorious Service (Gold) was bestowed on Enoch Sontonga posthumously.

See also
Sol Plaatje

References

1873 births
1905 deaths
People from Uitenhage
Xhosa people
South African Protestants
South African composers
South African male composers
National anthem writers
Xhosa-language poets
Xhosa-language writers
19th-century male musicians